Tonawanda Creek is a creek in Central Ontario, Canada. It is part of the Great Lakes Basin and is a right tributary of the Big East River.

Course
The creek rises at an unnamed intermittent lake near the community of Ravensworth in the municipality of Kearney in Parry Sound District. It then flows southwest, then southeast, passes over the Banning Dam, takes in the right tributary Little Tonawanda Creek, and reaches its mouth at the Big East River in the township of Lake of Bays, Muskoka District Municipality. The Big East River flows via the North Branch Muskoka River, then the Moon River and Musquash River to Lake Huron.

Tributary
Little Tonawanda Creek (right)

See also  
List of rivers of Ontario

References

Rivers of Parry Sound District
Rivers of Muskoka District